Ángeles Amador Millán (born 10 October 1949) is a Spanish politician and lawyer. She served as Minister of Health and Consumer Affairs from July 1993 to May 1996. She has a son, Pablo Bustinduy, who went on to become a prominent figure as a Podemos politician.

References

1949 births
Living people
Complutense University of Madrid alumni
Politicians from Madrid
20th-century Spanish women politicians
Health ministers of Spain
Independent politicians in Spain
Women government ministers of Spain